Elements is a compilation album by American rapper B.o.B, released on November 4, 2016, by his independent label No Genre. It is composed of his 2015 and 2016 conscious mixtapes WATER, FIRE, EARTH and AIR, where he comments on society, politics and conspiracy theories. The compilation was released as a prelude to his fourth album and the fifth installment in the Elements series, Ether.

On October 21, 2021 the compilation was re-released in a vinyl version.

Charts

WATER 

WATER (We Are The Enemy Really) is a mixtape by American recording artist B.o.B. The project was produced entirely by B.o.B himself, and released on December 4, 2015, by No Genre. The tracks "Cold Bwoy (Freestyle)", "Purple Mountain" and "Blank Mafia" from the mixtape were released with their music videos.

Music and lyrics
In the mixtape the rapper raps mainly over trap productions, and lyrics about corruption and dangers of the government.

Track listing

FIRE 

FIRE (False Idols Ruin Egos) is a mixtape by American recording artist B.o.B. The project was produced entirely by B.o.B himself, and released on January 18, 2016, by No Genre.

The tracks "Bend Over", "Excuse Me" and "Summers Day" from the mixtape were released with their music videos.

Music and lyrics
The mixtape has productions with various influences of funk, jazz, soul and electronic, and opens with news and other audio clips about drug deaths and other tragic occurrences, hinting that the emcee wants to get to the bottom of what’s happening to hip hop and politics. Throughout the tape, B.o.B. seems disillusioned with the state of hip hop.

Track listing

EARTH 

EARTH (Educational Avatar Reality Training Habitat) is a mixtape by American recording artist B.o.B. The project was produced entirely by B.o.B himself, and was released on April 22, 2016, on Earth Day, by No Genre.

The tracks "Earthquake" and "$tacks of Dreams" from the mixtape were released with their music videos.

Music and lyrics 
The main themes of the mixtape are B.o.B's belief that the earth is flat and conspiracy theories. The mixtape contains samples of speeches by scientists, pundits, and Barack Obama, and spans also controversial topics like astral projection and cloning.

The track "Flatline Pt.2" is an extended and revisited version of his song "Flatline", released on his SoundCloud account in January 2016.

Track listing

AIR 

AIR (Art Imitates Reality) is a mixtape by American recording artist B.o.B. The project is entirely self-produced, and it was released on August 29, 2016, by No Genre.

The tracks "Escape", "War Witch" and "Air Bender" from the mixtape were released with their music videos.

Music and lyrics 
The mixtape is based on gospel-esque productions influenced by trap, and lyrics where the rapper talks about the ruling class and their propaganda and illicit yet obvious institutions.

Track listing

References

B.o.B albums
2016 compilation albums
Hip hop compilation albums
Albums produced by B.o.B
Alternative hip hop compilation albums
Political hip hop albums
Concept album series